Jason Oakes born 29 September 1977 in Shotley Bridge, County Durham, England was a rugby union player for Newcastle Falcons in the Guinness Premiership. Oakes' position of choice is as a lock. He has previously played for Otley and Blaydon.

In 2007 Oakes was forced to retire due to injury.

References

External links
Newcastle Falcons profile

1977 births
Living people
English rugby union players
Newcastle Falcons players
Rugby union locks
Rugby union players from Shotley Bridge